The Marine Conservation Society is a UK-based not-for-profit organization working with businesses, governments and communities to clean and protect oceans. Founded in 1983, the group claims to be working towards "cleaner, better-protected, healthier UK seas where nature flourishes and people thrive." The charity also works in UK Overseas Territories.

Efforts

The Clean Seas work as a team to reduce pollution on beaches and in oceans by encouraging change within the public, the industries and the governments. Reducing reliance on single-use plastic is one of their focal points, with a focus on the impact of PFAS or 'forever chemicals'.

The Fisheries and Aquaculture team encourages sustainable fishing methods. They work to stop overfishing and replace stock. Additionally, they promote the eating of sustainable seafood via the Good Fish Guide.

The Ocean Recovery works as a team with management authorities and local communities to manage marine protection projects and to protect oceans.

The Marine Conservation Society is a membership organization and relies on income from members, individual donations and corporate support. The charity is sometimes known by its initials MCS.

Campaigns

Beachwatch - the largest volunteer beach cleaning and litter survey in the UK has been running for over 25 years, involving almost 20,000 volunteer beach cleaners annually. The Great British Beach Clean is a national event which takes place every third weekend in September.

Stop Ocean Threads, which addresses clothing fiber pollution.

Don't bottle it Boris  works towards introducing a bottle return program within the UK.

Good Fish Guide - the guide (online, smartphone app and pocket paper version) includes the Marine Conservation Society Fish to Eat and Fish to Avoid lists and advice on choosing fish to eat from populations that aren't endangered or caught by means which may be considered habitat wrecking.

Timeline

 1975 – Bernard Eaton (editor of Diver magazine) proposed an "Underwater Conservation Year" with the help of such key figures as David Bellamy. The first meeting was held in the Wig and Pen Club in Fleet Street.
 1977 – The first "Conservation Year" with the Prince of Wales as president. Hundreds of divers surveyed marine habitats.
 1978 – The "Underwater Conservation Society" was established in Ross-on-Wye on the success of the "Conservation Year". Bob Earl was the new UCS Project coordinator.
 1983 – Name changed to Marine Conservation Society and registered with the Charity Commission 
 1986 – MCS start "Seasearch" with the Joint Nature Conservation Committee
 1987 – Published Golden List of Clean Beaches - now called the Good Beach Guide
 1988 – Ross-on-Wye office burns down.
 1993 – First Beachwatch weekend
 1998 – MCS wins protection for Basking sharks
 1999 – MCS starts lobbying for a review of marine nature conservation in UK
 1999 – MCS members magazine is first printed in color
 2000 – Office opened in Scotland
 2001 – Launches Adopt-a-turtle scheme
 2007 – MCS staff and supporters march on Parliament calling for a strong Marine Bill
 2008 – MCS celebrates Silver Jubilee
 2009 – Marine Act passed
 2009 – Your Seas Your Voice Campaign launched
 2010 – Scottish Marine Act passed
 2011 – MCS' sustainable seafood advice was the cornerstone of Channel 4 Big Fish Fight series led by Hugh Fearnley-Whittingstall
 2012 – Launches Sea Champions - national volunteer programme offering environmental volunteer opportunities in the UK
 2013 – MCS led 2,000 people in a march on Parliament to demand Marine Conservation Zones
 2016 - 23 additional Marine Conservation Zones designated in English waters bringing the total so far to 50	
 2017 - Seasearch divers document damage in outer Loch Carron which becomes an emergency Marine Protected Area 	
 2018 - #StopthePlasticTide campaign launched on billboards up and down the country
 2018 - MCS expressed concern over deaths of the creatures at a Sea Life centres.
 2019 - Sustainability of over 760 million seafood meals improved this year thanks to use of the Good Fish Guide	
 2020 - Work starts on ground-breaking turtle management work in UK Virgin Islands and Montserrat

Celebrity support
Doug Allan
Ben Garrod
Miranda Krestovnikoff
Chris Packham 
Simon Reeve
Lizzie Daly
Deborah Meaden
Iolo Williams
Zoe Lyons	
Fernando Montano	
Cyrus Todiwala OBE DL
Inka Cresswell	
Suzie Rodgers MBE	
Tom 'The Blowfish' Hird

Awards

The Marine Conservation Society won the Coast Magazine Best Green Marine Campaign Award in 2011" for its Beachwatch project.

The charity's Great British Beach Clean project was shortlisted by the BBC Countryfile Magazine Awards for the Conservation Success of the Year 2018 and won the award.

References

External links
Marine Conservation Society Website
Seasearch

Conservation in the United Kingdom
Environmental organisations based in the United Kingdom
Fisheries conservation organizations
Fishing in the United Kingdom
1983 establishments in the United Kingdom
Marine conservation organizations
Organisations based in Herefordshire
Organizations established in 1983
Ross-on-Wye
Science and technology in Herefordshire